, released in English as Banshee's Last Cry, is a visual novel created by Chunsoft. It was first released for Super Famicom (the Japanese version of the Super NES) and was later ported to other consoles. An English localized version of the game was translated by Jeremy Blaustein and was released for Android and iOS by Aksys Games in 2014. The game is the second sound novel by Chunsoft and brought a myriad of other companies to develop similar games. The term "sound novel" was a registered trademark, but is regarded as a genre. The game was a financial success. It sold 750,000 units for Super Famicom and over 400,000 units for PlayStation. The game sold 1.25 million units with remakes and ports in April 2002.

Gameplay 

The player reads the text on a gamebook.

Plot 
After finding a note and losing phone calls, a group of guests solve the case about the murder. Additional deaths occur for a bad ending if the player lacks all clues.

Development 
The game was revealed in the guidebook. The contest called for readers to write the storyline with the event. It was allotted for submissions and many readers cannot finish it. Ten were published in a book titled  for the short story and gamebook. The book was a success, despite the fact that it targeted readers. The writers received the money for publishing a book. A similar competition started upon the release of Kamaitachi no Yoru 2. It went out of print after many years, but was re-published after making the sequel.

Music 
Kōjirō Nakashima and Kōta Katō composed the game. It gained significant popularity and was reused in television shows about Aum Shinrikyo. The background for the crime was used in the show. Two songs, "Sequence" and "Two People Return Alive" were orchestrated for the fourth volume of Orchestral Game Music Concerts.

Graphics 
Background images included the lodge in Hakuba, Nagano. Exceptions are the background for bathrooms and the wine cellar with miniatures. All characters have silhouettes. The English localization changed the setting including the graphic at British Columbia.

Ports

Releases 
The game was ported to PlayStation on December 3, 1998 and for Game Boy Advance on June 28, 2002. It was released on SoftBank Mobile on April 1, 2002, and on PC on July 1, 2002. i-mode released it on January 30, 2004. The story had minor changes for the script of Kamaitachi no Yoru × 3 for PlayStation 2. Aksys Games released the game in English for iOS entitled Banshee's Last Cry in January 2014.

Changes 
 PlayStation version
 A flow chart was added and choices were colored according to whether choosing in previous arcs
 The player may replay the scenes
 Vibration added
 Two stories were added
 Changes in unlocking the extra storylines and parodies
 Improved graphics
 Added background information on characters
 Game Boy Advance version (comparison with PlayStation version)
 The characters were changed after the ones for the sequel
 A commercial message for the sequel can be unlocked
 No vibration
 Two extra stories were excluded after lacking cartridge spaces
 Some minor changes in the script

Related media

Radio drama 
A radio drama was released on Compact Disc. The characters appeared in a different story-line with biochemical weapons. It stars Hikaru Midorikawa and Yumi Tōma.

Television drama 
The two-hour drama series was aired by Tokyo Broadcasting System on July 3, 2002. Kamaitachi no Yoru 2 was released on July 18 of the same year, and the first edition of the game contained a bonus DVD of the entire drama. Like the radio drama version, the television is not a rendition of the actual game (the premise is that the fans gathered to shoot a film based on the game, when one of the characters are killed). It recreated the tense and mysterious atmosphere.

Reception 
Famitsu scored the Game Boy Advance game 31 out of 40, and for Super Famicom for 30 out of 40.

See also 
 Otogirisō
 Machi (video game)
 428: Shibuya Scramble

References

External links 
 Official page (iOS version)
 Virtual Console page 
 Knulp (the ski lodge used in background graphics) 
 Instruction manual (Super Famicom) at Giant Bomb

1994 video games
Adventure games
Android (operating system) games
Chunsoft games
Detective video games
Game Boy Advance games
1990s horror video games
Psychological horror games
IOS games
Kadokawa Dwango franchises
Mobile games
Murder–suicide in fiction
Mystery video games
PlayStation (console) games
PlayStation Network games
Single-player video games
Super Nintendo Entertainment System games
Survival video games
Video games about crime
Video games developed in Japan
Video games set in Japan
Virtual Console games
Virtual Console games for Wii U
Visual novels
Works set in hotels